Shelopuginsky District is an administrative and municipal district (raion), one of the thirty-one in Zabaykalsky Krai, Russia. It is located in the center of the krai, and borders with Sretensky District in the north, Gazimuro-Zavodsky District in the east, Aleksandrovo-Zavodsky District in the south, and with Akshinsky District in the west. Its administrative center is the rural locality (a selo) of Shelopugino. Population:  9,773 (2002 Census);  The population of Shelopugino accounts for 39.1% of the district's total population.

History
The district was established on August 24, 1961.

References

Sources

Districts of Zabaykalsky Krai
States and territories established in 1961

